The Australian Missile Corporation (AMC) is an Australian company specialising in guided missiles, wholly owned by Queensland-based NIOA. It was contracted by the Australian Government to help develop Australia's domestic guided weapons capability. Its inaugural and current chief executive officer, Lee Goddard, is a retired Rear Admiral of the Royal Australian Navy.

As part of a 2021 initiative, headed by the Federal Department of Defence, the Guided Weapons and Explosive Ordnance Enterprise ("GWEO") program is intended to facilitate an Australian domestic missile manufacturing capacity. It is also supported by multinational arms companies Thales Group, Lockheed Martin and Raytheon.

GWEO was established under the Prime Ministership of Scott Morrison, whose messaging throughout his career not irregularly touched on the importance of Australia's defence infrastructure and capabilities. A RAND Corporation analysis from 2022 notes the creation of the GWEO was prefaced in a 2020 report.

History
On 3 June 2021, Black Sky Aerospace and Quickstep are among the first companies to partner with the Australian Missile Corporation in their bid for the Australian Government's sovereign guided missiles project.

On 22 August 2022, the AMC agreed to enter into a strategic partnership with American defence contractor Day & Zimmermann.

On 23 August 2022, the AMC received the backings of MBDA, a European guided weapons joint venture of Airbus, BAE Systems and Leonardo.

On 22 September 2022, the AMC formally accepted the contact to become an inaugural Enterprise Partner for the GWEO.

See also

List of modern armament manufacturers

References

External links

 

Australian companies established in 2021
Companies based in Brisbane
Corporate subsidiaries
Defence companies of Australia
Family-owned companies of Australia
Guided missile manufacturers
Manufacturing companies established in 2021
Privately held companies of Australia